The 2016 season marked the 109th season in which the Richmond Football Club participated in the AFL/VFL.

2015 off-season list changes

Retirements and delistings

Trades

Note: All traded picks are indicative and do not reflect final selection position

Free agency

National draft

Rookie draft

2016 squad

2016 season

Pre-season 

Source:AFL

Home and away season 

Source: AFL Tables

Ladder

Awards

League awards

All-Australian team

Brownlow Medal tally

Rising Star
Nominations:

22 Under 22 team

Club awards

Jack Dyer Medal

Michael Roach Medal

Reserves
The 2016 season marked the third consecutive year the Richmond Football club ran a stand-alone reserves team in the Victorian Football League (VFL). 
Richmond senior and rookie-listed players who were not selected to play in the AFL side were eligible to play for the team alongside a small squad of VFL-only listed players. The team finished ninth out of 15 participating clubs, with a record of nine win and nine losses. Each of the club's nine home matches were played at the Punt Road Oval.

Playing squad

References

External links 
 Richmond Tigers Official AFL Site
 Official Site of the Australian Football League

Richmond Football Club seasons
Richmond Tigers